Tȟaté  is a wind spirit in Lakota mythology. There are four primary wind spirits, referenced in relation to the four directions.  It is thought that the wind unites "all" in one spirit, and that eagles, who stand on the wind, are the carrier of vision.  Tate is said to guide one through obstacles.
 
As the invisible realm, wind connects past present and future, connecting ancestors and future generations, uniting humankind into the essential, eternal spirit.  

Lakota spirit beings
Lakota culture
Lakota words and phrases